Dunham Bridge is a toll bridge across the River Trent in England.  It spans the border between Nottinghamshire and Lincolnshire to the west and east respectively.  It forms part of the A57 road, in the section between the Great North Road and Lincoln.  It takes its name from the nearby village of Dunham-on-Trent.

The General Estates Company, which also runs the Bathampton and Whitchurch toll bridges, has a stake in the ownership of Dunham Bridge.

History

Until the bridge was built and opened in 1832, the crossing of the river was by Dunham Ferry. In 1814, the fare was reported at half a crown.

The bridge was established in the 1830s, under the powers of the Dunham Bridge Act 1830, when a group of local businessmen organised the original four-span, cast-iron construction by the civil engineer, George Leather (1786–1870).

The first person to cross the bridge was Eliza Woolas of Laneham, who used a sixteen-inch batten to span the remaining gap on a Sunday - presumably when no workmen were present.

The superstructure was rebuilt on its original piers in 1977–79 to trunk road standards. A new toll plaza was opened in 1994 by the Right Honourable Mr. Michael Dennis, doubling the number of lanes through the booths from two to four.
During the rebuilding, a temporary bridge was built with single lane usage, controlled with temporary traffic signals.

Tolls
The tolls were last increased in 2013. Tariffs are regulated by the Department for Transport. Passage is free at all times for pedestrians, cyclists, motor-cyclists and three-wheeled invalid carriages. On Christmas Day and Boxing Day, passage is free for all traffic.

Dunham Bridge has been closed several times due to flooding, mainly on the Lincolnshire side: in 1897, 1977, 2001, and during the last week of December 2012 due to flooding. It was also closed in March 2020 due to the COVID-19 pandemic.

Further reading

See also
List of crossings of the River Trent

References

External links
Dunham Bridge Toll Company

Bridges in Nottinghamshire
Bridges in Lincolnshire
Bridges completed in 1832
Bridges completed in 1979
Toll bridges in England
Bridges across the River Trent